Serra da Bodoquena National Park is a national park in the state of Mato Grosso do Sul, Brazil.

Location

The park belongs to the cerrado biome.
The park is in the Pantanal Biosphere Reserve, which also includes the Pantanal, Chapada dos Guimarães and Emas national parks, and the Serra de Santa Bárbara, Nascentes do Rio Taquari and Pantanal de Rio Negro state parks.
It covers parts of the municipalities of Porto Murtinho, Jardim, Bonito and Bodoquena, Mato Grosso do Sul.

Conservation

The park is classified as IUCN protected area category II (national park).
It has the objectives of preserving natural ecosystems of great ecological relevance and scenic beauty, enabling scientific research, environmental education, outdoors recreation and eco-tourism.
Protected species include the catfish Ancistrus formoso, Jaguar (Panthera onca) and cougar (Puma concolor).

Notes

Sources

2000 establishments in Brazil
National parks of Brazil
Protected areas of Mato Grosso do Sul
Cerrado